Panay State Polytechnic College was the former name of the Mambusao and Pontevedra campuses of Capiz State University, a state university in the Philippines based in Roxas City. The college was the result of merger between Mambusao Agricultural and Technical College based in Mambusao and Capiz Agricultural and Fishery School based in Pontevedra. The basis of the merger was Batas Pambansa Blg. 91 issued on December 24, 1980, by then President Ferdinand E. Marcos. The college underwent a series of name changes beginning on June 22, 1958, with the passage of Republic Act No. 2088 converting Mambusao High School to Panay National Agricultural School.

Realizing the mistake in using Panay National Agricultural School due to existence of the same school in Banga, Aklan, Philippine Congress on June 19, 1960, passed a law to amend the name to Mambusao National Agricultural School. On June 22, 1963, Republic Act No. 3763 was passed into law converting the school into a college renaming it into Mambusao Agricultural and Technical College. Then it was merged with Capiz Agricultural and Fishery School to create Panay State Polytechnic College. By virtue of Republic No. 9273, Panay State Polytechnic College was fused with other colleges in Capiz to create the Capiz State University.

References
 www.lawphil.net/statutes/repacts/ra2004/ra_9273_2004.html

Universities and colleges in Capiz